Greenlanders are people identified with Greenland or the indigenous people, the Greenlandic Inuit (Grønlansk Inuit; Kalaallit, Inughuit, and Tunumiit). This connection may be residential, legal, historical, or cultural. For most Greenlanders, many of these connections exist and are collectively the source of their being Greenlandic. However, the term can in different contexts be delimited more precisely in different ways: as the inhabitants of Greenland, as nationals of Greenland or more broadly as persons who feel a cultural affiliation in a broad sense to Greenland. More controversial is a more recent use of the word in the sense persons of Greenlandic origin, i.e. persons whose parents were born in Greenland. 

The indigenous people of Greenland, or the Greenlandic Inuit, have indigenous status in the Kingdom of Denmark. 

Nationals of Greenland are citizens of Denmark and are overseas countries and territories (OCT) nationals; this also means that Greenlanders are EU citizens, due to Greenland's associated relationship to the European Union.

The Greenlandic Inuit are the indigenous and most populous ethnic group in Greenland. Most speak Kalaallisut (West Greenlandic), and consider themselves ethnically Inuit. 

Approximately 89 percent of Greenland's population of 57,695 is Greenlandic Inuit, or 51,349 people . Ethnographically, they consist of three major groups:
 the Kalaallit of west Greenland, who speak Kalaallisut
 the Tunumiit of Tunu (east Greenland), who speak Tunumiit oraasiat ("East Greenlandic")
 the Inughuit of north Greenland, who speak Inuktun ("Polar Inuit")

Historically, Kalaallit referred specifically to the people of Western Greenland. Northern Greenlanders call themselves Avanersuarmiut or Inughuit, and Eastern Greenlanders call themselves Tunumiit, respectively.

Today, most Greenlanders are bilingual speakers of Kalaallisut and Danish and most trace their lineage to the first Inuit, the Thule culture, that came to Greenland around 1300 AD. The vast majority of ethnic Greenlanders reside in Greenland or elsewhere in the Realm of Denmark, primarily Denmark proper (approximately 20,000 Greenlanders reside in Denmark proper). A small minority reside in other countries, mostly elsewhere in the Nordic countries and North America. There are, though, a large number of Greenlanders and Greenlandic families who today are multi-ethnic, mostly due to marriages between Greenlanders and Danes as well as other Europeans. Some individuals of Danish heritage who were born or grew up in Greenland may also self-identify as Greenlandic or as ‘Greenland Danes’.

Definition 

There are several ways to define what a Greenlander is, and the meaning has also changed over time, just as today it can have both an inclusive and exclusive meaning.  The word Greenlander is used in several different meanings:

 The population in Greenland, i.e. all with permanent legal residence in Greenland. At the beginning of 2020, there were 56,081 inhabitants in Greenland.
 Nationals with connections to Greenland as nation (also called persons specially connected to Greenland). At the beginning of 2020, there were 50,189 people born in Greenland. However, there are no official statistics on how many Greenlanders live outside Greenland and abroad.
 More unofficially, a Greenlander is often perceived as a person who has a cultural (not least linguistic) affiliation with Greenland and even has an identity of being a Greenlander.

As for Danish citizens and by persons with a special connection to Greenland, there are no official statistics for how many persons of Greenlandic origin reside abroad.

Regions
The Inuit are descended from the Thule people, who settled Greenland in between AD 1200 and 1400. As 84 percent of Greenland's land mass is covered by the Greenland ice sheet, Inuit live in three regions: Polar, Eastern, and Western. In the 1850s, additional Canadian Inuit joined the Polar Inuit communities.

The Eastern Inuit, or Tunumiit, live in the area with the mildest climate, a territory called Tunu or Tasiilaq. Hunters can hunt marine mammals from kayaks throughout the year.

Language

Kalaallisut is the official language of Greenland. It is the western variety of the Greenlandic language, which is one of the Inuit languages within the Inuit–Yupik–Unangan family. Kalaallisut is taught in schools and used widely in Greenlandic media.

History

The first people arrived in Greenland from the Canadian island of Ellesmere, around 2500 to 2000 BCE, from where they colonized north Greenland as the Independence I culture and south Greenland as the Saqqaq culture. The Early Dorset replaced these early Greenlanders around 700 BCE, and themselves lived on the island until c. 1 CE. These people were unrelated to the Inuit. Save for a Late Dorset recolonisation of northeast Greenland c. 700 CE, the island was then uninhabited until the Norse arrived in the 980s. Between 1000 and 1400, the Thule, ancestors of the Inuit, replaced the Dorset in Arctic Canada, and then moved into Greenland from the north. The Norse disappeared from southern Greenland in the 15th century, and although Scandinavians revisited the island in the 16th and 17th centuries, they did not resettle until 1721. In 1814, the Treaty of Kiel awarded Greenland to Denmark.

The primary method of survival for the Thule was hunting seal, narwhal, and walrus as well as gathering local plant material.  Archaeological evidence of animal remains suggests that the Thule were well adjusted to Greenland and in such a way that they could afford to leave potential sources of fat behind.

European visitors to Northeast Greenland before the early 19th century reported evidence of extensive Inuit settlement in the region although they encountered no humans. In 1823, Douglas Charles Clavering met a group of twelve Inuit in Clavering Island. Later expeditions, starting with the Second German North Polar Expedition in 1869, found the remains of many former settlements, but the population had apparently died out during the intervening years.

In 1979, the Greenlanders voted to become autonomous. There is an active independence movement.

The population of Greenlandic Inuit has fluctuated over the years. A smallpox outbreak reduced the population from 8,000 to 6,000 in the 18th century. The population doubled in 1900 to 12,000 then steadily rose by around 100 people each year from 1883 to 1919. Tuberculosis caused a drop in the population, but after several decades of steady birth rates and commercial fishing over traditional hunting, the population reached 41,000 in 1980.

Society
Gender roles among Greenlandic Inuit are flexible; however, historically men hunted and women prepared the meat and skins. Most marriages are by choice, as opposed to arranged, and monogamy is commonplace. Extended families are important to Inuit society.

Greenland Inuit diet consists of a combination of local or traditional dishes and imported foods, with the majority of Inuit, aged 18 to 25 and 60 and older, preferring customary, local foods like whale skin and dried cod over imported foods like sausage or chicken. That study also reveals that those who grew up in villages only consumed local, Inuit cuisine foods 31 times a month and those who lived in Danish areas would consume local, Inuit cuisine 17 times per month. The reasons for the lack of traditional food consumption varies, but 48 percent of respondents claim that they wanted to have variety in their diet, 45 percent of respondents said it was difficult to obtain traditional foods, and 39 percent said that traditional foods were too expensive.

The kinds of whale that have been historically hunted and consumed are the minke and fin whales; both are under watch by the International Whaling Commission (IWC). Greenland Home Rule implemented IWC quotas on aboriginal whale hunting, reducing hunting of minke whales to a maximum of 115 per year and fin whales to 21 per year.

Art
The Greenlandic Inuit have a strong artistic practice based on sewing animal skins (skin-sewing) and making masks. They are also known for an art form of figures called tupilait or "evil spirit objects". Sperm whale ivory (teeth) remains a valued medium for carving.

Customary art-making practices thrive in Ammassalik Island. Ammassalik wooden maps are carved maps of the Greenlandic coastline, used in the late 19th century.

See also
List of features in Greenland named after Greenlandic Inuit
Inuit Circumpolar Council
Kayak angst
Human rights in Denmark#Indigenous rights
Danish people in Greenland
Greenlandic people in Denmark

Notes

References

External links

Inuit Circumpolar Council: Greenland
Culture and History of Greenland , Greenland Guide
Colonialism in Greenland: An Inuit Perspective 

 
Inuit groups
Indigenous peoples in the Arctic
Ethnic groups in Greenland
Inuit